Templeton Fox (born Esther Fox; July 24, 1913 – January 9, 1993) was an American actress best known for her work in old-time radio.

Early years 
Born in Pasadena, California, Fox is the daughter of Mr. and Mrs. Lawrence B. Fox. She went to school in Elgin, Illinois, and attended Pomona College. She won a talent contest sponsored by a hotel in Los Angeles and gained early acting experience at the Pasadena Community Playhouse. She changed her first name after being advised by a numerologist to do so.

Career

Radio 
Before Fox became an actress, she was a singer in Los Angeles. After her parents moved to Chicago, they challenged her to audition with NBC, which resulted in her gaining a contract as a dramatic actress on that network in September 1935. Her roles on radio programs included those shown in the table below.

Programs on which Fox had supporting roles included Manhattan at Midnight, Lights Out and The Mystery Man.

Film
Fox worked at Metro-Goldwyn-Mayer, mostly in bit parts. Her film credits include Tony Rome, Fate Is the Hunter, Hush… Hush, Sweet Charlotte, Who's Been Sleeping in My Bed?, and Shock Treatment.

Stage 
In 1942, Fox portrayed Miriam Blake in a production of Guest in the House in Boston.

Television 
Fox's television appearances include roles in Hazel, Route 66, Dennis the Menace, The Thin Man, My Three Sons, Slattery's People, Gentle Ben, My Living Doll, and Peyton Place. In 1975, she was a last-minute replacement to play Ralph Kramden's mother-in-law on the 25th anniversary episode of The Honeymooners after Doro Merande, the actress slated for that role, died suddenly.

Personal life
On August 15, 1938, Fox married Robert Lyon Welch in Chicago. Welch worked with a radio advertising agency. She retired from acting to raise their son and daughter. Welch died in 1964. Fox died on January 9, 1993, in Los Angeles, California.

References 

American film actresses
American radio actresses
American television actresses
Actresses from Pasadena, California
20th-century American actresses
1913 births
Year of death missing
Pomona College alumni